"Can't Believe It" is a single by American singer-songwriter/producer T-Pain. It was released on July 29, 2008. The song is the first official single from T-Pain's album Thr33 Ringz. The song also features rapper Lil Wayne.  This is the second collaboration between T-Pain & Lil Wayne released as a single.

Music video
The video premiered on BET's Access Granted on Monday August 25, 2008, at 7:30 pm. It was made in front of a green screen and features many special effects. The video is mostly based on T-Pain's Thr33 Ringz; the music video had many effects from the circus. T-Pain served as an assistant director; however, he was never credited for it.

Dolla, MeMpHitz and the entire Nappy Boy Entertainment roster (Tay Dizm, Jay Lyriq, Sophia Fresh, Young Cash, and DJ Lil Boy) make a cameo appearance towards the end of the video.

Remixes
The official remix features pop singer and Jive Records labelmate Justin Timberlake. It was released on November 7, 2008. The digital download single was released on December 5, 2008. There are two versions to the official remix; the first version, the main remix, has a duet 3rd verse with T-Pain and Justin Timberlake and the second version, the digital download & CD single remix, has the 3rd verse with Justin Timberlake only. The official Konvict Remix features Akon and Kardinal Offishall. There are other remixes by 50 Cent and Bow Wow. There's also a T-Wayne version where Lil Wayne has a second verse along with ad-libs throughout the entire song.

Covers
Notable musicians have made covers of the song. R&B Singer JoJo has made a cover to this song. R&B Singer Trey Songz made a cover and renamed it "Gotta Believe It". Rapper Charles Hamilton has made a remake of this song entitled "Word? Aight!", which is a Soulja Boy diss record. Chris Richardson most popular for being on American Idol Season 6 has made a cover to this song. Travis Garland from boy band NLT has made a cover to this song; the track featured Kevin McHale also from NLT. Also was sampled by up and coming rapper Lil Dicky as "The Cootchie Song". Ghanaian-American singer Moses Sumney and jazz musician Sam Gendel released the cover of "Can't Believe It" on September 10, 2021.

Track listing

Promo CD single
"Can't Believe It" (Clean)
"Can't Believe It" (Main)
"Can't Believe It" (Instrumental)
"Can't Believe It" (Acapella)

CD Remix
"Can't Believe It (Official Remix)" (featuring Justin Timberlake) – 5:22

Chart positions
"Can't Believe It" debuted at No. 29 on the Billboard Hot 100 making it T-Pain's highest debut on the chart. It started gaining more airplay each week, causing it to rise up to the top ten peaking at No. 7 making it T-Pain's fifth top ten hit on the chart.  It has also recently climbed up the charts due to increased sales after the release of the remix. The song also managed to just enter the UK top 100 at 100. This was because of little promotion and airplay, It was added to BBC Radio 1's Upfront List where it remained there for 3 weeks. The song was also A-listed on the BBC 1XTRA playlist.

Weekly charts

Year-end charts

Certifications

References

2008 singles
T-Pain songs
Lil Wayne songs
Song recordings produced by T-Pain
JoJo (singer) songs
Songs written by Lil Wayne
Songs written by T-Pain
2008 songs
Jive Records singles